Jim Johnson (born 1945) is a retired personality on The Roe Conn Show on WLS (AM) 890 in Chicago, where he was a news reporter and occasionally participated in the on-air discussion with the other on-air personalities.

Personal life and education
Johnson grew up in Chicago and the North Woods of Wisconsin. His father was also in the news business working at the City News Bureau of Chicago, that with the Chicago Sun Times. When the family lived in the North Woods, they built and operated a hunting and fishing lodge. This lodge was a popular vacation spot for Chicago politicians, judges, policemen, and firefighters, including then Mayor of Chicago Richard J. Daley and his son and future Mayor, Richard M. Daley. Jim married his college sweatheart, Denise. Their daughter, Alexis, following in her father and grandfather's footsteps, is a TV reporter and weekend anchor in Kansas City, Missouri.

Johnson has a bachelor's and master's degree in communications from the University of Illinois.

Career
Johnson began his broadcasting career as a television news anchor in Champaign, Illinois. He is known as a veteran of Chicago Broadcasting taking part in television and radio news for more than 3 decades. He entered the Chicago news business at the age of 23 in 1968, perhaps one of the most turbulent years in Chicago history with Assassination of Martin Luther King, Jr. starting riots and the anti-war protests. In the late 1970s, Johnson worked as reporter at ABC 7 Chicago in addition to his work with the radio. The 1980s saw him working as a fill-in news anchor at the Steve and Garry Show with Steve Dahl and Garry Meier. Johnson then began to work for the Roe and Garry Show. He continued to work with Roe Conn as co-hosts changed throughout the years.

According to Johnson, some of his major achievements include creating the Canarbale Wagon and the Jimism. The 'Canarble Wagon' being a segment airing on the Roe Conn Show every Friday on at 5:00 pm. It is a time when the cast of the show order alcoholic beverages from the Canarble Wagon. The name 'Canarble Wagon' comes from Johnson's early days in journalism. When he was a reporter at the City Hall press room, veteran reporters told a story of a newspaper reporter who would come back from lunch drunk. This reporter could not pronounce the word cocktail; instead, the word canarble was heard. Johnson added the word wagon to canarble and the Canarble Wagon was made. The Jimism being "the practice of botched news reporting". If a listener "catches" a Jimism, they can call in to the station and report it. If Johnson did say a Jimism, the caller will win a "I Caught a Jimism" T-shirt.

On Tuesday, April 30, 2013, Jim announced on air during the Roe & Roeper show that the will retire when his current contract expires in June 2013. His final newscast was at 6:30 p.m. on June 28, 2013. He was replaced by news anchor Susan Carlson.

References

Living people
1945 births
Radio personalities from Chicago